Eustachius may refer to:

 Variant of the name Eustathius

Saint Eustachius
Bartolomeo Eustachi (c. 1500–1510 – 1574), anatomist
Eustáquio van Lieshout (1890–1943), Dutch missionary in Brazil
Eustochius, fifth bishop of Tours from 443 to 460
Eustathius, son of Macrobius